Kemboi is a surname of Kenyan origin that may refer to:

Edwin Kemboi Sutter (born 1973), Kenyan ICT specialist and the first Chief Officer for ICT and e-Government in the County Government of Uasin Gishu, Kenya. He is credited with automation of public services in Uasin Gishu county to enhance efficiency in service delivery. 
David Kemboi Kiyeng (born 1983), Kenyan marathon runner and two-time Reims Marathon
Elijah Kemboi (born 1984), Kenyan marathon runner and 2011 Košice Marathon winner
Ezekiel Kemboi (born 1982), Kenyan steeplechase runner and two-time Olympic champion
Micah Kemboi Kogo (born 1986), Kenyan long-distance runner and 2008 Olympic medallist
Nicholas Kemboi (born 1983), Kenyan long-distance runner competing for Qatar
Nicholas Kemboi (born 1989), Kenyan middle-distance runner
Polat Kemboi Arıkan (born 1990), Kenyan long-distance track runner competing for Turkey
Simon Kemboi (born 1967), Kenyan 400 metres sprinter and World Championships medallist

See also
Kipkemboi, related name meaning "son of Kemboi"

Kalenjin names